is an international airport on an artificial island in Ise Bay, Tokoname City in Aichi Prefecture,  south of Nagoya in central Japan.

Centrair is classified as a first class airport and is the main international gateway for the Chubu ("central") region of Japan. The name  is an abbreviation of Central Japan International Airport, an alternate translation used in the English name of the airport's operating company, . 10.2 million people used the airport in 2015, ranking 8th busiest in the nation, and 208,000 tons of cargo was moved in 2015.

History

Chubu Centrair serves the third largest metropolitan area in Japan, centered around the city of Nagoya. The region is a major manufacturing centre, with the headquarters and production facilities of Toyota Motor Corporation and production facilities for Mitsubishi Motors and Mitsubishi Aircraft Corporation.

With much lobbying by local business groups such as Toyota, especially for 24-hour cargo flights, construction started August 2000, with a budget of JPY¥768 billion (€5.5 billion, US$7.3 billion), but through efficient management nearly ¥100 billion was saved. Penta-Ocean Construction was a major contractor.

According to Japanese media sources, Kodo-kai, a Yakuza faction in the Yamaguchi-gumi group, earned an immense amount of money by being the sole supplier, via a front company called Samix, of dirt, rock, sand, and gravel for the airport construction project.  Although several Samix executives were criminally indicted for racketeering, the prosecutions were later dropped.  According to the sources, Kodo-kai had informants working within the Nagoya police who fed the organization inside information which allowed them to stay a step ahead of investigating authorities.

When Chubu Centrair opened on 17 February 2005, it took over almost all of the existing Nagoya Airport's (now Nagoya Airfield) commercial flights, and relieved Tokyo and Kansai areas of cargo shipments. As a replacement for Nagoya Airport, it also inherited its IATA airport code NGO. The airport opened in time to service the influx of visitors for Expo 2005, located near Nagoya.

Aichi Governor Hideaki Omura announced in December 2021 that two new runways were planned at the airport: a 3,290 m parallel runway to the east of the existing runway, to be completed in 2027, and a 3,500 m runway on the west side of the airport, which would replace the existing runway.

Route withdrawals
There were several withdrawals from Chubu Centrair after the airport commenced its operation. American Airlines operated a route to Chicago for less than seven months in 2005, but said the service was "not as profitable as we had hoped". In 2008, after a few years of service from Chubu Centrair, several airlines cancelled certain flights and put others on hiatus, including Malaysia Airlines' suspension of flight to Kuala Lumpur, Jetstar ending its airport operation, Continental Airlines stopping its Honolulu flight and United Airlines' suspension of flights to San Francisco, citing low premium cabin demand. This flight also continued to Chicago until 2007. Emirates and HK Express left the airport in 2009, although HK Express resumed service from September 2014. Japan Airlines also ended its flights to Paris in 2009 and Bangkok in 2020. Garuda Indonesia ended service from Denpasar in March 2012, but returned to Nagoya with the opening of direct flights from Jakarta in March 2019 but only lasted until March 2020.  EVA Air left the airport in June 2012 (they have since planned to resume service from June 2019). TransAsia Airways subsidiary V Air withdrew from Centrair and ended operations in October 2016.

Northwest Airlines operated routes from Nagoya to Detroit, Guam, Manila, Saipan, and Tokyo-Narita prior to its 2009 merger with Delta Air Lines. Delta took over this operation and added a Honolulu route in 2010, growing to nine daily flights at Nagoya, but cancelled most of these services over the next decade. Delta's last two routes at Nagoya, Detroit and Honolulu, were suspended due to the COVID-19 pandemic in 2020. The Detroit route resumed on a weekly basis in April 2021, but Delta announced its permanent cancellation in 2023.

Aichi Sky Expo 
An exposition centre inside the airport island was opened on August 30, 2019. The exposition centre has 6 exhibition halls each being 10,000 m2. Events held at the venue include the 2019 edition of the Wired Music Festival on September 7 and 8.

Terminals

The northern side of the terminal holds domestic flights, while the southern side holds international flights, each with dedicated ticket counters, security checkpoints and baggage carousels, and for international flights, immigration and customs facilities. Arrivals are processed on the second floor, and departures on the third. The lower level is used for maintenance, catering, and other ground operations, as well as for passenger buses to hardstands in the middle of the airport ramp. There are thirteen gates for domestic flights (including three bus gates), and fourteen for international flights (including three bus gates). Terminal 2 is a domestic and international terminal for budget airlines, with 11 gates for international flights and 9 gates for domestic flights.

Statistics

Airlines and destinations

Passenger

Notes
 Some destinations may be affected by COVID-19, therefore temporary suspensions are not distinguished as seasonal service.

Cargo

Ground transportation

Train

Central Japan International Airport Station, the train station for Centrair is located on the Meitetsu Airport Line operated by Nagoya Railroad (Meitetsu). The fastest "μSky Limited Express" service connects the airport to Meitetsu Nagoya Station in 28 minutes. All μSky Limited Express are operating at a max speed of 120 km/h by 2000 series trains, which have all seats designated and it is required to purchase an extra 360 yen "special limited express ticket". Meitetsu Nagoya Station is adjacent to JR Nagoya Station, allowing transfers to Shinkansen bullet trains bound for not only Tokyo and Osaka but also many major cities, as well as JR, Meitetsu, and Kintetsu local trains, and the Nagoya Municipal Subway.

There is a proposal for a JR line linking Centrair to Nagoya Station and the JR network through Taketoyo Line's Okkawa Station. However, there's no actual construction works have been implemented at the moment.

There's also a proposal for Aonami line linking Centrair to Nagoya Station by constructing a tunnel or bridge. Nagoya municipal government has acted the assessment of feasibility in 2019.

Bus
Centrair Limousine provides direct bus service to and from central Nagoya, Sakae, and major hotels. It is operated by a private bus company in Mie Prefecture. High-speed buses to the neighboring prefectures for 3,000 yen to Kyoto via Mie Prefecture have been operating.

Ferry
A ferry connects to the passenger terminal in Tsu – a 40-minute trip.

Car
A toll road links Centrair and the mainland.

Bicycle
Bicycles are not allowed on the Centrair Bridge toll road to the mainland. Cyclists departing the airport must either take a Meitetsu local train one stop to Rinkū Tokoname Station or a taxi across the bridge to the Rinkū Interchange north of Aeon Mall Tokoname.

Shopping
Centrair features the Sky Town Shopping Center on the fourth floor, accessible to the general public, with 61 shops and restaurants, organized into two "streets", Renga-dori and Chochin-yokocho. The Chochin-yokocho shops are individually themed to have an authentic Japanese look.
A Seattle-themed retail complex called "Flight of Dreams" opened in 2018, with a Boeing 787 as a display centerpiece.

Other facilities

The Boeing Dreamlifter Operations Center is located on the airport's apron, to the south of the main terminal. This facility is used to store Japanese components of the Boeing 787 aircraft while awaiting airlift to the assembly facility in the US.

Accolades
 2009: fourth Best Airport in the World of the Airport Service Quality Awards by Airports Council International
 2011: fifth Best Airport Worldwide of the Airport Service Quality Awards by Airports Council International and Best Airport by Size in the 5 to 15 million passenger category.
 2015: Skytrax announced Chubu International Airport won the first place in the "Best Regional Airport 2015" award and first place in the "Best Regional Airport – Asia" award for the fifth year running.
 2016: Skytrax rated Chubu International Airport as the "World's Best Regional Airport 2016" and the sixth "Best Airport Worldwide"
 2017: Chubu International Airport became the first airport in the world to achieve "5-Star Regional Airport Rating" by Skytrax.
 2018: For 4 consecutive years, Chubu International Airport won "The World's Best Regional Airport" award (Skytrax). Chubu was also ranked the seventh best airport in the world.

References

External links 

  
 Japan Mint: The Opening of CHUBU CENTRAIR International Airport 500 Yen Commemorative Silver Proof Coin
 
 
 

Airports established in 2005
Airports in Japan
Artificial island airports
Artificial islands of Japan
Buildings and structures in Aichi Prefecture
Economy of Nagoya
Transport in Nagoya
Tokoname
Tourist attractions in Aichi Prefecture
2005 establishments in Japan